Still Within the Sound of My Voice is the forty-third album by American singer/guitarist Glen Campbell, released in 1987 (see 1987 in music).  This was his debut album with MCA Records.

Track listing

Side one

 "I'm a One-Woman Man" (Tillman Franks, Johnny Horton) – 2:31
 "Still Within the Sound of My Voice" (Jimmy Webb) – 4:08
 "The Hand That Rocks the Cradle" (Ted Harris) – 3:05 (duet with Steve Wariner)
 "For Sure, for Certain, Forever, for Always" (Webb) – 3:16
 "I Have You" (Gene Nelson, Paul Nelson) – 3:18

Side two

 "You Are" (Becky Hobbs, Don London) – 2:33 (duet with Emmylou Harris)
 "Arkansas" (Joe Rainey) – 2:43
 "In My Life" (Michael Cody, Mark H. Chesshir) – 4:02
 "Leavin's Not the Only Way to Go" (Roger Miller) – 3:43
 "I Remember You" (Johnny Mercer, Victor Schertzinger) – 2:48

Personnel
Glen Campbell – lead vocals, background vocals, acoustic guitar, electric guitar
Matt Betton – drums
David Hungate – bass guitar
Billy Joe Walker Jr. – acoustic guitar, electric guitar
Mark O'Connor – acoustic guitar, fiddle, viola, mandolin
Larry Byrom – acoustic guitar, electric guitar
Mike Lawler – synthesizer
John Barlow Jarvis – piano, DX-7
T.J. Kuenster – piano
Craig Fall – acoustic guitar
Curtis "Mr. Harmony" Young – background vocals
Lee Greenwood – background vocals
Willie Nelson – background vocals

Production
Jimmy Bowen – producer
Glen Campbell – producer
Chuck Ainlay – mixing
Peter Nash – photography
Bill Brunt Designs – design
Simon Levy – art direction
Bob Bullock – recording engineer
Willie Pevear – recording engineer
Marty Williams – engineer
Russ Martin – engineer
Mark J. Coddington – engineer
Tim Kish – engineer
Milan Bogdan – digital editing

Chart performance

Album

Singles

References

Glen Campbell albums
1987 albums
MCA Records albums
Albums produced by Jimmy Bowen